Robert Grier may refer to:

 Bobby Grier (American football player) (born 1933), American college football player who broke color barrier
 Bobby Grier (American football executive), American football executive and coach
 Robert Cooper Grier (1794–1870), American jurist